The following is a list of fictional characters from the Austin Powers series of films.

Austin Powers is a series of American spy action comedy films: Austin Powers: International Man of Mystery (1997), Austin Powers: The Spy Who Shagged Me (1999) and Austin Powers in Goldmember (2002). The films were produced and written by Mike Myers, who also starred as the title character and Dr. Evil. They were directed by Jay Roach and distributed by New Line Cinema.

The franchise parodies numerous films, TV shows and characters — including the James Bond series, Jason King, Danger Man, The Prisoner, The Man from U. N. C. L. E., Matt Helm and The Avengers, to name just a few — and incorporates myriad other elements of popular culture as it follows a British spy's quest to bring his nemesis down. The character represents an archetype of 1960s Swinging London, with his advocacy of free love, his use of obscure impressions and his clothing style.

The films poke fun at the outrageous plots, rampant sexual innuendo, and two dimensional stock characters associated with 1960s spy films, as well as the cliché of the ultra suave super spy.

The general theme of the films is that the arch villain Dr. Evil plots to extort large sums of money from governments or international bodies but is constantly thwarted by Powers, and (to a degree) his own inexperience with life and culture in the 1990s.

In Austin Powers: International Man of Mystery, Austin and Dr. Evil are awakened after being cryogenically frozen for thirty years. Continuing to incorporate cultural elements of the 1960s and 1970s, Austin Powers: The Spy Who Shagged Me and Austin Powers in Goldmember feature time travel as a plot device and deliberately overlook inconsistencies. A proposed fourth film, Austin Powers 4, has reportedly been in development since 2005, but has since been stalled.

Main characters

Austin Powers

 Portrayed by: Mike Myers
 Appears in: Austin Powers: International Man of Mystery, Austin Powers: The Spy Who Shagged Me, Austin Powers in Goldmember
 Based on: James Bond and other secret agents

Austin Powers is a British secret agent, an "international man of mystery." He works as a fashion photographer by day and a British Intelligence agent by night, and always becomes extremely excited when an attractive woman is working with him or is simply nearby. He is the main protagonist of the series.

In all three films, Austin learns of a new plot by Dr. Evil and intervenes to prevent it. His quests to prevent Dr. Evil from carrying out his schemes often involve his meeting various types of people, getting into fights, and getting caught up in wacky situations. He has a new young and sexy female ally in every film (not counting Marie Kensington).

Dr. Evil

 Portrayed by: Mike Myers
 Appears in: Austin Powers: International Man of Mystery, Austin Powers: The Spy Who Shagged Me, Austin Powers in Goldmember
 Based on: Ernst Stavro Blofeld

Douglas Powers, better known as Dr. Evil, is the incredibly bumbling, as well as extremely dimwitted evil genius and nemesis of Austin Powers, and the main antagonist of the series. He is the leader of an evil organization, Virtucon, with many henchmen as his allies. He concocts ridiculous schemes in every film, with Austin attempting to stop him from his doings. However, he never wins, often because his plans are always ridiculously overcomplicated; he is far too stupid to realize how much easier they can be. Other times, it is because something happens that interferes.

He resembles Alec Trevalyan/Agent 006 in some ways, as Dr. Evil and Austin Powers were raised as brothers (before the car explosion), much like James Bond and Alec Trevelyan, who were raised at the same orphanage before they were recruited by MI6. Also, Dr. Evil and Austin Powers attended the same spy academy together. Interestingly, the Daniel Craig James Bond films would later reinterpret the character of Ernst Stavro Blofeld (the chief inspiration for Dr. Evil) as a long-lost foster brother figure to Bond, somewhat (likely unintentionally) echoing the Austin Powers/Dr. Evil relationship.

Dr. Evil's schemes often include his attempts to take over the world. They sometimes involve threatening to destroy or hurt something in exchange for money; one notable example is when he presented his giant laser to the president of the United States and said he would destroy Washington D.C. and possibly other major cities unless he was paid one hundred billion dollars. Aside from his schemes, Dr. Evil and his son Scott talk to each other, but he is a completely awful father, and Scott is often shown to be far more intelligent than his father.

He was originally born Douglas Powers, son of Nigel Powers and twin brother to Austin Powers. He has a son with Frau Farbissina named Scott Evil, who is also the grandson of Nigel Powers and the nephew of Austin Powers.

Austin's allies

Basil Exposition
 Portrayed by: Michael York
 Appears in: Austin Powers: International Man of Mystery, Austin Powers: The Spy Who Shagged Me, Austin Powers in Goldmember
 Based on: M

Basil Exposition works for British Intelligence as Austin's controller. A happy-go-lucky man, he is very fond of Austin, saying he is "irresistible to women, deadly to his enemies and a legend in his own time." He and Austin both went to the British Intelligence Academy together at the same time, presumably how they met. Basil often provides Austin with gadgets to help him complete his missions, and he is often seen wearing a carnation, even during his and Austin's time at the academy. His surname is a joke on his principal function in the films: to provide Austin and the audience with the necessary exposition.

Vanessa Kensington
 Portrayed by: Elizabeth Hurley
 Appears in: Austin Powers: International Man of Mystery, Austin Powers: The Spy Who Shagged Me
 Based on: Tracy Bond

Vanessa Kensington is Austin's partner in Austin Powers: International Man of Mystery, and the daughter of Austin's original partner, Marie. A beautiful, determined, intelligent young woman, Austin is heavily attracted to her, and often goes to great lengths to try to get her to sleep with him. She is disgusted by his attempts for much of the film, and continuously resists his temptations, but later grows more attracted to him. At the end of the film, she and Austin marry, and are last seen while on their honeymoon (see Austin Powers: International Man of Mystery).

In Austin Powers: The Spy Who Shagged Me, she is revealed to be (or to have been replaced by) a Fembot when she tries to kill Austin while they are in their honeymoon suite. Later, Basil claims the ministry knew this ahead of time.

Felicity Shagwell
 Portrayed by: Heather Graham
 Appears in: Austin Powers: The Spy Who Shagged Me
 Based on: Anya Amasova, Holly Goodhead

Felicity Shagwell is a CIA agent who is partnered with Austin Powers when it is discovered that Vanessa is a Fembot and to help Austin get his mojo back. Like Vanessa, she is very beautiful physically, which Austin simply cannot resist being attracted to. However, she is much more attracted to him than Vanessa initially was, and they fall in love with one another. (See Austin Powers: The Spy Who Shagged Me).

Felicity is notable for having slept with Fat Bastard in the line of duty to place a tracking device on him, which at first Austin is unhappy with. However, he eventually forgives her, and they work together to defeat Dr. Evil. She was originally intended to appear in the third film, in a scene that explained what happened to her character, but the scene was cut from the final release.

Foxxy Cleopatra
 Portrayed by: Beyoncé Knowles
 Appears in: Austin Powers in Goldmember
 Based on: Rosie Carver, blaxploitation-style characters 

Foxxy Cleopatra is Austin's groovy musician sidekick and former lover in Austin Powers in Goldmember. She is from the 1970s, dressing in fashionable clothing of the era and sporting a very large afro. She uses the word "sugar" often, pronouncing it as "sugah" (e.g. "You under arrest, sugah!"). She and Austin are reunited after eight years when Austin travels back to the 1970s, and they work together to stop Dr. Evil and Goldmember (see Austin Powers in Goldmember).

Her character is inspired by "blaxploitation"-style characters played by Pam Grier and Tamara Dobson.

Number 3
 Portrayed by: Fred Savage
 Appears in: Austin Powers in Goldmember

Number 3 is a very young agent and mole who works undercover for British Intelligence. He is assigned by his employers to become the assistant of Number 2, Dr. Evil's right-hand man. He manages to successfully get Mini-Me to change sides when Scott Evil takes his place next to Dr. Evil. (See Austin Powers in Goldmember)

Despite his talents at his job, he has an enormous black mole on his face that neither Austin nor Dr. Evil can resist pointing out whenever they see him, making him a source of comedy in the film. Coincidentally, he works as a mole and has a mole on his face, of which he is painfully aware.

Nigel Powers
 Portrayed by: Michael Caine, Scott Aukerman (Young)
 Appears in: Austin Powers in Goldmember
 Based on: James Bond

Nigel Powers is a Master Spy and Austin and Dr. Evil's father. When he took his family on a vacation and stopped to find a restroom, their car exploded, and Nigel returns to see that his wife is dead and that Austin survived, but is very frightened. He assumes "Dougie (Dr. Evil's actual first name is Douglas)" is dead (though he's actually living inside his mother's carcass), and continues to raise Austin.

He and his son are very much alike – they both enjoy a jetsetting, playboy lifestyle, and both are incomparable ladies' men. Their relationship is nevertheless strained, as Nigel was absent for much of Austin's childhood, and seems uninterested in having anything more than a casual friendship with his son. During Austin's knighthood, Nigel did not show up to be there for him, and Austin is later seen singing "Daddy Wasn't There" with his band, Ming Tea. He later reveals that he feels neglected by Nigel, who often gives him minimal respect. However, they manage to make up by the end of the film (see Austin Powers in Goldmember).

Nigel is also extremely prejudiced against Dutch people, but hypocritically claims that he doesn't tolerate anyone who cannot stand the cultures of other people.

Mrs. Kensington
 Portrayed by: Mimi Rogers
 Appears in: Austin Powers: International Man of Mystery
 Based on: Emma Peel

Marie Kensington is Austin's original sidekick back in the 1960s, and Vanessa's mother. She had originally tried to help Austin defeat Dr. Evil until he escaped, but the duo unfortunately failed. Having retired years after, her daughter works alongside Austin after he is unfrozen many years later, and she makes a brief appearance while on the phone with her daughter. Like Miss Moneypenny, she vaguely admits to having an attraction to Austin despite being married, but never follows through with it. She does not appear again in the series.

Dr. Evil's allies

Frau Farbissina

 Portrayed by: Mindy Sterling
 Appears in: Austin Powers: International Man of Mystery, Austin Powers: The Spy Who Shagged Me, Austin Powers in Goldmember
 Based on: Rosa Klebb

Frau Farbissina is Dr. Evil's attack and defense specialist and Scott's mother. She has a heavy German accent. In a running gag throughout the films, her shouting, with the emphasis usually put on the last syllable, causes everyone to flinch.

Farbissina and Dr. Evil were lovers at one point in time, but now she identifies herself as a lesbian. She introduces her former lover to Scott when he returns. However, she actually cares about Scott and wants him to be happy, unlike his father. Scott did not know that Farbissina was his biological mother until Scott's next appearance on The Jerry Springer Show.

The character is a parody of Rosa Klebb from From Russia With Love.

Number 2
 Portrayed by: Robert Wagner (The younger version of Number 2 is played by Rob Lowe.)
 Appears in: Austin Powers: International Man of Mystery, Austin Powers: The Spy Who Shagged Me, Austin Powers in Goldmember
 Based on: Emilio Largo, a henchman to Ernst Stavro Blofeld who has the codename Number 1 in the novel Thunderball and Number 2 in the film adaptation.

Number 2 is Dr. Evil's second in command who wears an eyepatch. He and Dr. Evil have known each other for many years, having attended school together, but he never liked his boss and constantly feels "second best" behind him. Number 2 is actually a much better leader than Dr. Evil and has a series of high-earning legitimate businesses behind him. Dr. Evil fails to appreciate this and always favours 'evil' schemes.

In the first film, Number 2 has developed Virtucon, the legitimate front of Evil's empire, into a multibillion-dollar enterprise by the time Dr. Evil is thawed. During the fight between Austin Powers and Dr. Evil, it is interrupted by Number 2 who attempts to betray Dr. Evil by making a deal with Powers. Dr. Evil uses a trap door to eliminate Number 2.

In the second film, Number 2 has survived the trap door and the base's self-destruction, which have left some burn scars on his face. He introduces Dr. Evil to his clone Mini-Me and reveals that Virtucon has purchased Starbucks. Using a time machine, Dr. Evil and Mini-Me meet with a younger Number 2 and Frau Farbissina.

In the third film, Number 2 does not sport the scars seen in the previous film and has established the Hollywood Talent Agency for Dr. Evil which has signed George Clooney, Julia Roberts, and Leonardo DiCaprio so that Dr. Evil would make huge sums of legitimate money. He is with Dr. Evil and his followers at his base behind the Hollywood sign when Dr. Evil unveils his new plan to time-travel back to 1975 to enlist Goldmember.

Scott Evil
 Portrayed by: Seth Green
 Appears in: Austin Powers: International Man of Mystery, Austin Powers: The Spy Who Shagged Me, Austin Powers in Goldmember

Scott Evil is Dr. Evil's grown-up son with Frau Farbissina. Perturbed by the fact that his father was absent for so long, and suddenly decided to show up, Scott constantly refuses Dr. Evil's pleas to bond with him. He is also shown to be far more intelligent than his father, and is almost always able to find an easier way to carry out his father's plans, which often prompts Dr. Evil to argue with him.

Scott becomes increasingly evil (even losing his hair in the process) in the third film, and eventually replaces Mini-Me. Mini-Me eventually feels rejected by Dr. Evil and defects to Austin's side. At the end of Goldmember, Scott (now completely bald) swears revenge on Austin and his father, and has taken over his father's criminal empire (see Austin Powers in Goldmember).

Scott is also Nigel Powers' grandson and Austin Powers' nephew biologically. Since Mini-Me is a clone of Dr. Evil, that would also make him Scott's father or uncle.

Mini-Me

 Portrayed by: Verne Troyer
 Appearances: Austin Powers: The Spy Who Shagged Me, Austin Powers in Goldmember
 Based on: Nick Nack

Mini-Me is a miniature clone that was made of Dr. Evil before he was sent back in time. He is very similar to Dr. Evil except he is one-eighth his size. Mini-Me cannot talk, and often expresses himself with writing. However, he is never afraid to use his middle finger as an insult whenever necessary.

Dr. Evil babies Mini-Me, treating him both like a child and a pet. He carries him in a baby carrier strapped to his body at one point, and even later has him on a leash. Mini-Me also enjoys making Scott Evil's life miserable, which makes Dr. Evil have to restrain him.

Although he is incredibly small, he is a very strong fighter. Over time, Dr. Evil begins to neglect him as Scott becomes increasingly evil, and Number 3 eventually manages to successfully convince him to defect to Austin's side (see Austin Powers in Goldmember).

Fat Bastard

 Portrayed by: Mike Myers
 Appears in: Austin Powers: The Spy Who Shagged Me, Austin Powers in Goldmember

Fat Bastard is a Scottish henchman working for Dr. Evil. He is incredibly foul-mouthed and morbidly obese, weighing "a metric ton"; however, he thinks of himself as "dead sexy" – which he is heard calling himself – and believes that women find him irresistible.

In the second movie, he infiltrates the British Intelligence as a Scottish bagpiper and steals Austin's mojo, which is later taken back by his enemies. Later, Felicity Shagwell reluctantly sleeps with him in the line of duty to place a tracking device on him. (See Austin Powers: The Spy Who Shagged Me).

In the third movie, he is shown to have left Dr. Evil's employment, and has become a professional sumo wrestler in Japan. However, he is still doing strange jobs for Dr. Evil. At the end of the film, he is shown to have lost a lot of weight as a result of a Subway diet, but has a very large amount of excess skin (he even goes so far as to mention his neck looking "like a vagina.")

Goldmember

 Portrayed by: Mike Myers
 Appears in: Austin Powers in Goldmember
 Based on: Auric Goldfinger

Johann van der Smut, a.k.a. "Goldmember" is the main antagonist of Austin Powers in Goldmember. He is a rather peculiar and repulsive Dutch man, who wears a completely golden outfit and is the owner of a roller disco club. He teams up with Dr. Evil to kill Austin Powers and to take over the world, but is defeated and arrested by Foxxy Cleopatra.

Having lost his genitals in an unfortunate smelting accident, he replaces them with a golden key that activates the "Preparation H" tractor beam. His other peculiarity disgusts both Dr. Evil and Austin alike; he has a habit of peeling off his own skin and then immediately eating it (much to the disgust of everyone else), hence small portions of his skin are seen missing from his body.

Alotta Fagina
 Portrayed by: Fabiana Udenio
 Appears in: Austin Powers: International Man of Mystery
 Based on: Pussy Galore (in name), Fiona Volpe (Thunderball)

Alotta Fagina is Number 2's girlfriend and secretary. Her name is a parody of Pussy Galore, while her characterization, being Number 2's henchman, is based on Fiona Volpe. Number 2 first introduces Austin to her while they are in the casino, and Austin, as with almost every other female character he encounters, is attracted to her. Later, while Austin and Alotta were in her jacuzzi she successfully manages to seduce and have sex with him, in order to figure out his true identity (Austin introduced himself as "Richie Cunningham" during the blackjack game). She is seen in Dr. Evil's lair, where she threatens to kill Vanessa Kensington, but is instead judo chopped by her. It remains unknown whether or not Alotta survived the self-destruction of the lair or not.

In cable rebroadcasts, her name is sometimes censored to "Alotta Cleavage".

Ivana Humpalot
 Portrayed by: Kristen Johnston
 Appears in: Austin Powers: The Spy Who Shagged Me
 Based on: Xenia Onatopp 

Ivana Humpalot is a tall Russian woman who participates in the photo shoot Austin is taking pictures at in the beginning of the second film. She wears a Russian white fur hat and large white fur coat that goes from neck to ankle. Underneath that is a black nearly see through bodysuit that accentuates her breasts and legs. She wears a heavy amount of make-up and red lipstick. Ivana has a thick heavy Russian accent. At the behest of Austin, he makes her do erotic poses and then silly movements such as act like a lemur. After the shoot, he asks her if she wants to stick around for a bit. She accepts his offer so she can set out what she was sent to do, which is kill him. She and Austin play an erotic game of chess. Ivana seduces Austin by opening her robe to reveal some skin, squeezing her breasts together, taking chess pieces out between her breasts then licking the piece. Austin forwardly asks her if he makes her horny, leaving her speechless. He continues to the point where she seems appalled and doesn't know where to look. She gets up and reveals to him that she was actually sent by Dr. Evil to kill him, but fails to do so when she falls for him and claims he is too sexy and ends up having sex with him, although it does not last long as Austin loses his mojo before she can reach orgasm.

Mr. Bigglesworth
 Portrayed by: A Persian cat, later a Sphynx
 Appears in: Austin Powers: International Man of Mystery, Austin Powers: The Spy Who Shagged Me (miniature version) Austin Powers in Goldmember (flashbacks)
 Based on: Ernst Stavro Blofeld's cat

Mr. Bigglesworth is Dr. Evil's pet Persian cat, whom Evil ensures is happy at all times. Mustafa, one of Dr. Evil's henchmen, made a mistake during the unfreezing process, which caused Mr. Bigglesworth to lose all of his hair; he is bald for the rest of the film. Mini-Me has a tiny version of him called "Mini Mr. Bigglesworth" in Austin Powers: The Spy Who Shagged Me. The cat also appears as a kitten in flashbacks in the third film.

Mustafa
 Portrayed by: Will Ferrell
 Appears in: Austin Powers: International Man of Mystery, Austin Powers: The Spy Who Shagged Me

Mustafa is one of Dr. Evil's henchmen; he is an Arab who wears a red fez. His life is spared by Dr. Evil at the start of the first film, but a second mistake also puts his life on the line. While he feels pain like everyone else, he is near-impossible to kill.

In the first film, he made a mistake during the unfreezing process and caused Mr. Bigglesworth to lose all of his hair, thereby angering Dr. Evil and prompting his attempt to burn Mustafa alive by sending him down the trap door. However, the flames do not take his life, so Dr. Evil commands his guards to shoot him. Mustafa survives the first shot, but the second one seems to kill him since there's silence afterwards.

In the second movie, Austin and Felicity try to interrogate him in 1969 (when he was alive) – aided by the fact that he cannot stand being asked the same question three times in a row – but Mini-Me shoots him in the neck with a blow dart, sending him over the edge of a cliff. A post-credits scene reveals he has survived this, but his legs are broken as he asks any viewers left to fetch the usher.

Patty O'Brien
 Portrayed by: Paul Dillon
 Appears in: Austin Powers: International Man of Mystery, Austin Powers: The Spy Who Shagged Me

Patty O'Brien is an Irish henchman and assassin hired by Dr. Evil to kill Austin Powers. After he kills a victim, he leaves a charm from his charm bracelet behind with the body, and calls these pieces his "lucky charms", which he claims Scotland Yard is after. Both Dr. Evil and Frau laugh at this, with the latter explaining how the term is a reference to the famous brand of cereal.

He is present during one of the most famous scenes of the first Austin Powers movie. When Austin is sitting on a toilet in a stall at the casino restroom, he appears out of a vent above Austin and sneakily tries to strangle him with his charm bracelet. Austin traps him in-between his legs and asks him "Do you work for Number 2?" ("Who does Number 2 work for?" in later pressings of the film). The man in the adjacent stall (who thinks Austin is having trouble defecating) says "You show that turd who's boss!" O'Brien is killed in the situation, having been drowned in the toilet, and his charms are later seen on the restroom floor.

Random Task
 Portrayed by: Joe Son
 Appears in: Austin Powers: International Man of Mystery
 Based on: Oddjob

Random Task is a Korean assassin. A direct parody of Oddjob from the James Bond film Goldfinger, he throws a shoe instead of a hat.

When his shoe-throwing gimmick fails (he uses it to break off the head on a statue in Dr. Evil's lair, but not on a real person), he tries to strangle Austin following the self-destruction of Dr. Evil's lair, but instead Vanessa knocks him out.

Robin Swallows
 Portrayed by: Gia Carides
 Appears in: Austin Powers: The Spy Who Shagged Me
 Based on: Bond girls (name)

Robin Swallows (née Spitz) is an employee of Dr. Evil, who Austin encounters during a party in his apartment in 1969. She flirts with Austin while an assassin sneaks up to kill him. When Austin looks in her eyes he sees a man holding a throwing knife and uses Robin to block the attack. However, like Mustafa, she is shown to be incredibly difficult to kill; she is stabbed in the back, shot with an MP40, blasted with a bazooka, and falls out a window and over the edge of a building landing on her face, all of which fail to kill her. 

Her plan to distract Austin while an assassin sneaks up behind him and Austin seeing the assassin reflected in her eyes is a direct reference to the pre-credits opening of Goldfinger, where Bond survives an identical assassination attempt.

Other henchmen
 Portrayed by: Ben Scott (Jurgen), John-Clay Scott (Don Luigi), and Hannah Kozak (Rita)
 Appears in: Austin Powers: International Man of Mystery

Jurgen, Generalisimo, Don Luigi, and Rita are four of Dr. Evil's henchmen who appear at the very beginning of the first film, along with Frau Farbissina and Mustafa. Jurgen is a doctor, Generalisimo is a dictator, Don Luigi is a hook-handed crime boss, and Rita is a meter maid. Because they all failed to kill Austin Powers, Dr. Evil presses the button on his table that causes their chairs to flip back and send them into a pit of fire, incinerating all four of them, while sparing the lives of Frau and Mustafa.

Fembots
 Portrayed by: Cheryl Bartel (Cheryl Butner Klein), Cindy Margolis, Donna W. Scott, Barbara Moore, Cynthia Lamontagne
 Appears in: Austin Powers: International Man of Mystery, Austin Powers: The Spy Who Shagged Me, Austin Powers in Goldmember

The Fembots are extremely seductive female robots with breast cannons. Frau Farbissina uses them to seduce Austin, with intentions of killing him. Her plan almost works, but Austin does an exaggerated striptease in response, which drives them beyond their limit which causes their heads to explode.

Vanessa Kensington is revealed to be a Fembot in the beginning of Austin Powers: The Spy Who Shagged Me. A Fembot version of Britney Spears also makes an appearance in Goldmember, before being destroyed by Austin.

Other characters

Commander Gilmour
 Portrayed by: Charles Napier
 Appears in: Austin Powers: International Man of Mystery

Commander Gilmour is a commander who works for U.S. Strategic Command He is the one who is first notified of Dr. Evil's ship that "appears to be in the shape of a Big Boy" by Johnson Ritter, and makes sure to tell him to forget about what he saw. He travels to London, where he meets Austin after his unfreezing, and makes sure someone calls the president about what was seen. There, he briefs Austin on his mission. He also appears at the side of the president in the second film, and prevents the president from pressing the doomsday button in an attempt to destroy the moon. One of three characters named after players with the Toronto Maple Leafs (Myers' favorite National Hockey League team), Doug Gilmour in this case.

Dixie Normous
 Portrayed by: Gwyneth Paltrow
 Appears in: Austin Powers in Goldmember
 Based on:  Bond girls (name)

Dixie Normous is a woman whom Austin meets at the beginning of the third film, while he is at the party. A movie titled Austinpussy was in production, and she is the lead role in it, alongside Tom Cruise, who is playing Austin. She flirts with Austin for a short time.

Fook Mi and Fook Yu
 Portrayed by: Diane Mizota (Mi) and Carrie Ann Inaba (Yu)
 Appears in: Austin Powers in Goldmember
 Based on: Bond girls (Choo Mi)

Cindy Fook "Mi" and Sally Fook "Yu" are teenage Japanese twins (despite their more stereotypically Chinese name; it may be assumed that they have Chinese ancestry). The two of them speak with and flirt with Austin at the beginning of the film while they are at his party, which involves Fook Mi's asking for Austin's autograph and Austin's replying with such statements as, "Do you kiss your mother with that mouth?" and with admonitions to watch her language (of course not immediately noticing that is her name). Fook Yu is introduced to Austin by her sister after a moment or two. A deleted scene of the film actually reveals that their true names are Cindy and Sally, and that they only use Mi and Yu because of the wordplay with their names.

General Borschevsky
 Portrayed by: Elya Baskin
 Appears in: Austin Powers: International Man of Mystery
 Based on: Russian intelligence officers such as General Gogol in James Bond films

General Nicolai Borschevsky is a Russian Intelligence officer. He is alongside Commander Gilmour when Austin is first briefed about his mission. Austin at first thinks he is mad for working with Russian intelligence, not knowing the Cold War had ended. Borschevsky only has one line in the film, and does not immediately know who Austin Powers is; he wonders if Powers worked for British Intelligence. Basil replied that he worked freelance. He does not appear again in the film. One of the other character named after a Maple Leafs player, Nikolai Borschevsky in this case.

General Clark
 Portrayed by: Kevin Cooney
 Appears in: Austin Powers in Goldmember

General Clark is military general. In the third film, he is talking to Johnson Ritter about a satellite that appears out of orbit. Johnson is about to say it looks like something, but is interrupted by a repeated joke from the second film, this time with breasts rather than a penis and testicles. This part of the movie features a cameo by Ozzy Osbourne, who claims that it looks like a pair of boobs and points out that the joke was used in the previous film. He is named after Wendel Clark, former Leafs captain.

General Hawk
 Portrayed by: Charles Napier
 Appears in: Austin Powers: The Spy Who Shagged Me

General Hawk is an advisor to the president. He is notable for asking the president if he was suggesting that they blow up the moon, with the president replying to him and the other generals in the room, "Would you miss it?"

General Hawk is the second character in the series who is portrayed by Charles Napier; the other one is Commander Gilmour.

Ming Tea

 Portrayed by: Susanna Hoffs (Gillian Shagwell), Stuart D. Johnson (Manny Stixsman/As Stuart Johnson), Matthew Sweet (Sid Belvedere), Christopher Ward (Trevor Aigberth)
 Appears in: Austin Powers: International Man of Mystery, Austin Powers in Goldmember

Gillian Shagwell, Manny Stixsman, Sid Belvedere, and Trevor Aigberth compose Ming Tea, Austin's band. In Austin Powers in Goldmember, Austin sings with his band the song "Daddy Wasn't There" (as shown in the respective music video, interspersed with other clips from the film) at his pad after Austin's disappointing knighting, in which his father did not show up for him.

Mrs. Exposition
 Portrayed by: Kaye Wade
 Appears in: Austin Powers: International Man of Mystery

Mrs. Exposition is Basil's extremely frail and elderly British mother of 92 years. In the first movie, she makes a brief appearance when she comes in from Tunbridge Wells in Kent, where Basil introduces Austin to her. Austin, however, thinks she is a man in disguise (referencing an earlier scene), punching her in the face; after being scolded for his actions, Austin tries to clarify that she looked like a man and that she had been beaten with "an ugly stick."

Mr. Roboto
 Portrayed by: Nobu Matsuhisa
 Appears in: Austin Powers in Goldmember
 Based on: "Mr. Roboto" (name) Mr Osato (character)

Mr. Roboto is a Japanese businessman, owner of Roboto Industries. He helps Dr. Evil and Goldmember work on their tractor beam.

Earlier in the film, he is seen making an exchange with Fat Bastard, who later tells Austin and Foxxy what he is working on with Dr. Evil and Goldmember. Later, the duo confronts him, and he claims he has no idea what they are talking about, which does not convince them. Later in the film, when the tractor beam is complete, Mr. Roboto asks Dr. Evil for a raise in his paycheck via Japanese custom, but he is instead eaten by sharks without being paid at all.

He speaks partially in Japanese with English subtitles, but his office, which mostly contains white furniture washes out part of the meaning of the subtitles. Austin is offended at the suggestion he might have said "Please eat some shit," and "I have a huge rod" when he actually said "Please eat some shitake mushrooms," and "I have a huge rodent problem." Austin contradicts his earlier confusion by speaking a phrase of his own in Japanese: "I DO have a huge rod...I wish."

President
 Portrayed by: Tim Robbins
 Appears in: Austin Powers: The Spy Who Shagged Me

The President is the unnamed president of the United States. (In 1969, the real president would be Richard Nixon.) In Austin Powers: The Spy Who Shagged Me, Dr. Evil communicates with him via closed circuit TV. Evil plays him a scene from the film Independence Day to show what his laser can do if the President does not hand over one hundred billion dollars. The demand makes the President and his advisors laugh, as they do not believe that much money even exists. Dr. Evil continues to demand that the President show him the money, but the President continues to plead that they do not have it. The President does not appear again in Goldmember.

Radar operator  
 Portrayed by: Clint Howard
 Appears in: Austin Powers: International Man of Mystery, Austin Powers: The Spy Who Shagged Me, Austin Powers in Goldmember

Johnson Ritter is a radar operator,  who often says a line that leads up to something funny. In the first movie, he is the one who spotted Dr. Evil's ship and informed Commander Gilmour about it. In the third movie, he sees a similar thing; he is about to quote that it looks like a pair of breasts, but is interrupted by a vendor who shouts "melons" to advertise the melons she has for sale (a play on the slang term for breasts). He appears in all of the movies but only has a few lines in each of them, and what appears on his radar screen is always shown completely clearly.

Texan  
 Portrayed by: Tom Arnold
 Appears in: Austin Powers: International Man of Mystery
 Based on: J.W. Pepper
The Texan is an unnamed man wearing a cowboy hat who is seen in the first film talking to Austin in the casino restroom. He is in the stall next to the one Austin goes in.

Paddy O'Brien pops out of a vent above Austin in an attempt to strangle him with his charm bracelet. Austin and O'Brien struggle inside the stall, making many strange noises. The Texan can hear every noise, but can only see Austin's feet moving frantically, making him think Austin is having trouble on the toilet. He continuously provides Austin with advice and other helpful hints. At some point, Austin manages to get O'Brien trapped in-between his legs and hold him above the toilet bowl, asking him, "Do you work for Number 2?" ("Who does Number 2 work for?" in later pressings of the film).  The Texan, confused by this, tells him to "show that turd who's boss." When he exits the stall, the Texan sees O'Brien's dead body and asks, "Jesus Christ boy! What did you eat?!"

Una Brau
 Portrayed by: Mary Jo Smith
 Appears in: Austin Powers: The Spy Who Shagged Me

Una Brau is Frau Farbissina's love interest in the second film. She and Frau met on the LPGA tour and fell in love. She does not speak, and has a unibrow, hence her name. Later in the film, when Dr. Evil and Past Frau have sex, she comments that she'll never love another man. Clearly remembering Una Brau, he responds "Yes, that's true".

References

Austin Powers characters
Lists of film characters